The Diocese of Pala can refer to:

 Syro-Malabar Catholic Diocese of Palai in India
 Roman Catholic Diocese of Pala in Chad